Rogue Hostage is a 2021 American action thriller film directed by Jon Keeyes starring Tyrese Gibson with John Malkovich, Michael Jai White and Christopher Backus. It was released in the United States on June 11, 2021, by Vertical Entertainment and Redbox Entertainment.

Plot
The film is set in a rural U.S. state. Former Marine Kyle Snowden wakes up from a battlefield flashback nightmare. Snowden left the military after a frightening incident and works in Child Protective Services. He now lives with his young daughter, Angel, after his wife left them both.

A rogue group of mercenaries plans to attack Congressman Sam Nelson. The leader of the group, Eagan Raize, hates the Congressman. Eagan's father, Luther, was Nelson’s business partner and was sent to jail for eighteen years in a fraud case. Eagan believes that Nelson ruined his father’s life to take over the business. Sam Nelson is Kyle’s stepfather.

After an accidental shooting on the battlefield, Kyle Snowden's remorse was heavy and his sanity deteriorated. Following that incident, in which he unintentionally shot and killed his partner, he was unable to pick up a gun again.

Eagan attacks Nelson's store by planting a bomb while Kyle, Angel, and many others are in the store, taking them hostage. Kyle is reluctantly required to take up arms again. Eagan had planned to destroy Nelson and set an example for the town, but he ends up stealing money from the store and taking Sunshine at gunpoint because he is infatuated with her. After the murder of Kyle’s companion, Clove from Child Protective Services, a Spanish boy, Manny, becomes Kyle’s responsibility. Overcoming his fear, Kyle raids the store and saves the day.

Nelson tries to convince the police that it was a planned robbery and not an act of terrorism, planned in order to claim insurance money. However, his efforts are futile, when Mikki steals Nelson's money for herself and Sunshine. Kyle plans to request temporary custody of Manny from the court. Kyle and Nelson make peace at the end.

Cast
 Tyrese Gibson as Kyle Snowden
 John Malkovich as Congressman Sam Nelson
 Michael Jai White as Sparks
 Christopher Backus as Eagan Raize
 Holly Taylor as Mikki
 Luna Lauren Velez as Sunshine
 Carlos Sanchez as Manny
  Brandi Bravo as Clove Martinez 
 Zani Jones Mbayise as Angel Snowden
 Charlie Sara as Shane

Production
The film was originally titled Red 48. Filming wrapped in September 2020.

Reception
The film has a 0% rating on Rotten Tomatoes based on ten reviews.

Leslie Felperin of The Guardian awarded the film two stars out of five and wrote, "The whole shooting match is pretty bloody, and as cheesy as the dairy aisle, but decent fun to watch."

Jeffrey Anderson of Common Sense Media also awarded the film two stars out of five.

References

External links
 
 

2021 films
American action thriller films
2021 action thriller films
2020s English-language films
2020s American films